Vivien Alcock (23 September 1924 – 11 October 2003) was an English writer of children's books.

Life and career 

Alcock was born in Worthing, now in West Sussex, England, and her family moved to Devizes in Wiltshire when she was ten years old. She was the youngest of three sisters who were devoted to reading, drawing, and storytelling. Alcock studied at Oxford University's Ruskin School of Drawing until 1942, when she left the program to join the women's branch of the British Army (Auxiliary Territorial Service).

Alcock and Leon Garfield met while she was driving ambulances in Belgium. They married and adopted a daughter, named Jane after Jane Austen. Garfield became a successful children's writer in the 1960s.

Her own first book published was The Haunting of Cassie Palmer, from Methuen in 1980 when she was 56 years old. She followed The Haunting with The Stonewalkers (1981) and about twenty others. The Cuckoo Sister (1985) and The Monster Garden (1988) are her two most widely held works as catalogued by WorldCat libraries.

Published writings 

 The Haunting of Cassie Palmer (1980) – produced as a 1981 film of the same name 
 The Stonewalkers (1981) – also produced as an audio cassette
The Sylvia Game (1982)
 Travellers by Night (1983) 
 Ghostly Companions: A Feast of Chilling Tales (1984) – includes "A Change of Aunts" (1984) 
 The Cuckoo Sister (1985)
Wait and See (1986)
 The Mysterious Mr. Ross (1987)
 A Kind of Thief (1988)
 The Monster Garden (1988)
The Thing in the Woods (1989)
 The Trial of Anna Cotman (1989)
The Dancing Bush (1991)
 Singer to the Sea God (1992)
Othergran (1993)
 The Face at the Window (1994); US ed., Stranger at the Window (1998)
The Wrecker (1994)
 Time Wreck (1996); US ed., The Red-Eared Ghosts (1997)
The Silver Egg (1997)
A Gift on a String (1998)
Ticket to Heaven (2000) 
 The Boy Who Swallowed a Ghost (2001)

Awards and honours 
 Best science fiction/fantasy book, Voice of Youth Advocates, 1988, The Monster Garden
 Carnegie Medal, shortlist, The Trial of Anna Cotman 
 Notable Books for Children, American Library Association: 1985 Travellers by Night, 1986 The Cuckoo Sister, 1988 The Monster Garden
 Horn Book Honor List, The Horn Book Magazine: 1985 Travellers by Night
 Horn Book Fanfare Best Books of the Year: 1989 The Monster Garden, 1993 A Kind of Thief

Notes

References

External links 

 Obituary by Julia Eccleshare in The Guardian
 Vivien Alcock at Fantastic Fiction – bibliographic data with many cover images
 
 

1924 births
2003 deaths
English children's writers
People from Worthing
English women novelists
Auxiliary Territorial Service soldiers
20th-century English women
20th-century English people